The U-12 Softball World Cup is an international softball tournament for male and female players between age 10-12, and is the most elite and highest level of competition in its age category. It is organized by (WBSC). The tournament is held biennially, starting in 2019. The current champion is Chinese Taipei, who won the inaugural and the second competition as hosts.

The U-12 Softball World Cup is played under the WBSC's International Rules. Dimensions of regulation U-12 Softball World Cup ballparks (distance to the outfield fence, pitching mound, base paths, etc.) are significantly increased compared to local youth leagues, due to the superior nature and strength of the players involved.

History
The inaugural tournament was held in Tainan, Taipei from July 26 to July 30, 2019 concurrently with the 2019 U-12 Baseball World Cup. Four teams competed in the 2019 event, and Chinese Taipei won the event's first ever title. The second edition was postponed from 2021 to December 2022 due to the COVID-19 pandemic in Taiwan, and the event is held separately from the U-12 Baseball World Cup with the number of participating teams expanded to five.

Results

1 Republic of China, commonly known as Taiwan, due to complicated relations with People's Republic of China, is recognized by the name Chinese Taipei by most of the international organizations in sports competitions. For more information, please see Cross-Strait relations.
2 Originally scheduled to be held in 2021, but due to the COVID-19 pandemic, postponed to December 2022.

Medal table

Participating nations
 
 
 
 
 
  — Hosts

See also
 List of sporting events in Taiwan
 U-12 Baseball World Cup

References

U-12
World Baseball Softball Confederation competitions